Out of Our Father's House is a 1978 episode of PBS's Great Performances series. This episode was first broadcast on 2 August 1978 on PBS. The movie is a televised play of the work by Eve Merriam. The play is about six real-life leaders of the women's suffrage movement. The TV movie stars Jackie Burroughs as astronomer Maria Mitchell, Carol Kane as Eliza Southgate, Dianne Wiest as author Elizabeth Gertrude Stern, Maureen Anderman as Doctor Anna Howard Shaw, Kaiulani Lee as Elizabeth Cady Stanton, and Jan Miner as "Mother" Mary Jones (full name Mary Harris Jones).

The original play by the same name was written by Eve Merriam, and was based on her book "Growing Up Female in America".

References

External links 
 

1978 television films
1978 films
American television films